Heather Maxwell is an American singer-songwriter and radio host for Voice of America. She sings jazz standards and composes original works on piano, kamalen n'goni, balafon, and percussion.  Heather produces and hosts the radio and TV program Music Time in Africa for the Voice of America.

History
Maxwell was born Flint, Michigan and began singing at age 7 with her family's gospel band. She studied music and anthropology at Interlochen Arts Academy and University of Michigan, and African music at University of Ghana - West Africa. 

From 1989-1991 Maxwell was a Peace Corps volunteer in a rural village in Mali. She spent time in Paris and Abidjan recording and performing with African musicians.
From 1995-2003 she earned her master's degree and Ph.D. in ethnomusicology at Indiana University. Dr. Maxwell taught ethnomusicology at the University of Virginia. She also toured and recorded with jazz drummer Robert Jospé and with her own group Afrika Soul 

In 2011 Heather returned to Mali as a Fulbright Scholar for a teaching stint in Bamako at the National Conservatory of Music. The coup d'état on March 22, 2012 cut that short and she returned to the US. Later that year Heather joined the Voice of America in Washington, D.C. as host and producer of the worldwide radio program Music Time in Africa.

Discography
 1991 Keneya Ji Samasa Records, Mali
 1992 Pygmee by Group Worro, EMI/Pathé Marconi, Studio JBZ, Abidjan
 2006 Heartbeat by Robert Jospé's Inner Rhythm, Random Chance Records
 2008 Inner Rhythm Now by Robert Jospé's Inner Rhythm
 2010 Afrika Soul, Jesuno Baby Productions
 2014 "Mango Tree" (single) Jesuno Baby Productions
 2015 "All of Me" (single) Jesuno Baby Productions
 2016 "Abiro" (single) with Winyo, Jesuno Baby Productions

References

This article incorporates public domain text from the Voice of America.

External links
 Inner Rhythm official web site

Year of birth missing (living people)
Living people
Place of birth missing (living people)
Musicians from Flint, Michigan
University of Michigan alumni
Fulbright alumni